The year 1998 is the sixth year in the history of Pancrase, a mixed martial arts promotion based in Japan. In 1998 Pancrase held 14 events beginning with Pancrase: Alive 1.

Title fights

Events list

Pancrase: Advance 1

Pancrase: Advance 1 was an event held on January 16, 1998, at Korakuen Hall in Tokyo, Japan.

Results

Pancrase: Advance 2

Pancrase: Advance 2 was an event held on February 6, 1998, at the Yokohama Cultural Gymnasium in Yokohama, Kanagawa, Japan.

Results

Pancrase: Advance 3

Pancrase: Advance 3 was an event held on March 1, 1998, at the Kobe Fashion Mart in Kobe, Hyogo, Japan.

Results

Pancrase: Advance 4

Pancrase: Advance 4 was an event held on March 18, 1998, at Korakuen Hall in Tokyo, Japan.

Results

Pancrase: Advance 5

Pancrase: Advance 5 was an event held on April 26, 1998, at the Yokohama Cultural Gymnasium in Yokohama, Kanagawa, Japan.

Results

Pancrase: Advance 6

Pancrase: Advance 6 was an event held on May 12, 1998, at Korakuen Hall in Tokyo, Japan.

Results

Pancrase: Advance 7

Pancrase: Advance 7 was an event held on June 2, 1998, at Korakuen Hall in Tokyo, Japan.

Results

Pancrase: Advance 8

Pancrase: Advance 8 was an event held on June 21, 1998, at the Kobe Fashion Mart in Kobe, Hyogo, Japan.

Results

Pancrase: 1998 Neo-Blood Tournament Opening Round

Pancrase: 1998 Neo-Blood Tournament Opening Round was an event held on July 7, 1998, at Korakuen Hall in Tokyo, Japan.

Results

Pancrase: 1998 Neo-Blood Tournament Second Round

Pancrase: 1998 Neo-Blood Tournament Second Round was an event held on July 26, 1998, at the Aomori Prefectural Gymnasium in Aomori, Japan.

Results

Pancrase: 1998 Anniversary Show

Pancrase: 1998 Anniversary Show was an event held on September 14, 1998, at the Japanese Martial Arts Building in Tokyo, Japan.

Results

Pancrase: Advance 9

Pancrase: Advance 9 was an event held on October 4, 1998, at Korakuen Hall in Tokyo, Japan.

Results

Pancrase: Advance 10

Pancrase: Advance 10 was an event held on October 26, 1998, at Korakuen Hall in Tokyo, Japan.

Results

Pancrase: Advance 11

Pancrase: Advance 11 was an event held on November 29, 1998, at Umeda Stella Hall in Osaka, Osaka, Japan.

Results

Pancrase: Advance 12

Pancrase: Advance 12 was an event held on December 19, 1998, at the Tokyo Bay NK Hall in Urayasu, Chiba, Japan.

Results

See also 
 Pancrase
 List of Pancrase champions
 List of Pancrase events

References

Pancrase events
1998 in mixed martial arts